The 2013–14 Northern Colorado Bears men's basketball team represented the University of Northern Colorado during the 2013–14 NCAA Division I men's basketball season. The Bears were led by fourth year head coach B. J. Hill and played their home games at the Butler–Hancock Sports Pavilion. They were a member of the Big Sky Conference. They finished the season 18–14, 11–9 in Big Sky play to finish in a tie for fifth place. They advanced to the semifinals of the Big Sky Conference tournament where they lost to Weber State. They were invited to the CollegeInsdier.com Tournament where they lost in the first round to Texas A&M–Corpus Christi.

Roster

Schedule

|-
!colspan=9 style="background:#000066; color:#FFCC33;"| Regular season

|-
!colspan=9 style="background:#000066; color:#FFCC33;"| Big Sky tournament

|-
!colspan=9 style="background:#000066; color:#FFCC33;"| CIT

References

Northern Colorado Bears men's basketball seasons
Northern Colorado
Northern Colorado
Northern Colorado Bears men's basketball
Northern Colorado Bears men's basketball